The following is a list of Chinese films released in 2016.

Highest-grossing films
These are the top 10 grossing Chinese films that were released in China in 2016:

2016 Films

January – March

April – June

July – September

October–December

See also
2016 in China
List of 2016 box office number-one films in China

References

2016
Films
Chinese